New York's 6th congressional district is a congressional district for the United States House of Representatives in New York City, located entirely within Queens.  It is represented by Democrat Grace Meng. A plurality of the district's population is Asian-American, and a majority of its population is non-white.

The district includes several racially and ethnically diverse Queens neighborhoods, including Auburndale, Bayside, Elmhurst, Flushing, Forest Hills, Glendale, Kew Gardens, Maspeth, Middle Village, Murray Hill, and Rego Park. Prior to the 2022 election,  the district was redrawn to include sections of Jackson Heights and Astoria which were previously part of NY-14.

Voting

History

1789–1913:
Parts of Manhattan

1913–1945:
Parts of Brooklyn

1945–1973:
Parts of Queens

1973–1983:
Parts of Nassau, Queens

1983–present:
Parts of Queens

Various New York districts have been numbered "6" over the years, including areas in New York City and various parts of upstate New York. From 2003–2013, the district included most of Southeastern Queens including the neighborhoods of Cambria Heights, Edgemere, Far Rockaway, Hollis, Jamaica, Laurelton, Queens Village, Rosedale, Saint Albans, Springfield Gardens, and South Ozone Park, as well as John F. Kennedy International Airport. The district comprised mainly middle-class minority communities, but also included a part of Howard Beach known as Old Howard Beach.

List of members representing the district 

The 6th District was located in northern Queens and adjacent Nassau county until 1982, covering the same territory now in the 5th District. This part of Queens had been in the 7th District prior to that reapportionment.

1789–1813: One, then two seats
From 1809 to 1813, two seats were elected at-large on a general ticket.

1813–present: One seat

Election results

Note that in New York State electoral politics there are numerous minor parties at various points on the political spectrum. Certain parties will invariably endorse either the Republican or Democratic candidate for every office, hence the state electoral results contain both the party votes, and the final candidate votes (Listed as "Recap").

See also

 List of United States congressional districts
 New York's congressional districts
 United States congressional delegations from New York

References
 
 
 Congressional Biographical Directory of the United States 1774–present
 1996 House election data "
 1998 House election data "
 2000 House election data "
 2002 House election data "
 2004 House election data Clerk of the House of Representatives

Specific

06
Rockaway, Queens
Constituencies established in 1789